WB-4101 is a compound which acts as an antagonist at the α1B-adrenergic receptor. It was one of the first selective antagonists developed for this receptor and was invented in 1969, but is still commonly used in research into adrenergic receptors, especially as a lead compound from which to develop more selective drugs.

See also 
 Phendioxan

References 

Alpha-1 blockers